Armen Hakhnazarian (5 May 1941, Tehran - 19 February 2009, Aachen) was a Doctor of Architecture, Doctor of Technical Sciences and Founding Director of Research on Armenian Architecture (RAA) NGO.

Biography 

Hakhnazarian was the son of Hovhannes Hakhnazarian, a Doctor of Linguistics, lecturer at University of Tehran and Inspector of the Armenian schools in Tehran, and Arusyak Hakhnazarian, a piano teacher at Tehran State Conservatory.

In 1959 Hakhnazarian completed his studies at Kooshesh Davtian School, Tehran. In 1969 he earned his doctorate in architecture from the Department of Architecture of the Faculty of Architecture and Civil Engineering at RWTH Aachen University of Aachen. In 1973 he graduated from the Department of Urban Planning of the same faculty having earned another doctorate in technical sciences (Doktor der Ingenieurwissenschaften) as an architect-planner.

Hakhnazarian started his research activities in 1968, when he embarked on measuring St. Thaddeus Monastery in Artaz District (at present: Maku in West Azerbaijan Province, Iran). 
In the 1970s, Hakhnazarian made six research trips to Western Armenia (at present: Eastern Turkey), each lasting for almost two months.
Later, however, he was declared persona non grata and banned from participating in future research trips in Western Armenia. Nevertheless, he continued his studies by sending other researchers to Western Armenia, Armenia Minor and Cilicia up until his untimely death.

In 1973 Hakhnazarian married architect Margrit Buenemann. They have two daughters: Talin and Shahriz. 
In 1974 he founded and headed Monit Architectural Company in Tehran, Iran.
In 1982 he officially established Research on Armenian Architecture (RAA) NGO (Foundation since 2010) in Aachen, Germany. In 1996 it was registered in the United States, and in 1998 in Armenia.
In 1983 he started teaching in the Faculty of Urban Planning at Aachen University, Germany, his lecturer's career lasting for many years. 
Hakhnazarian died in Aachen, part of his ashes being buried there and the rest in the cemetery of Artashavan Village, Aragatzotn Region, Armenia.

Renovation activities

 St. Sargis Church in Vanak Quarter of Tehran, Iran
 Saint George Church of Tehran, Iran
 St. Stepanos Monastery in Jolfa County and St. Thaddeus Monastery in Maku, Iran
 Sourb Astvatzatzin (Holy Virgin) Monastery of Tzortzor, Maku, Iran
 Sourb Astvatzatzin (Holy Virgin) Church in Karintak Village, Shushi District, Artsakh
 Various buildings of Dadivank Monastic Complex, Karvajar District, Artsakh
 St. Minas Church of Tatev Village, Syunik Region, Armenia
 Church of Davit Bek Village, Syunik Region, Armenia
 Saghmosavank Monastery, Aragatzotn Region, Armenia
 The uni-nave church of St. Sargis Monastery in Ushi Village, Aragatzotn Region, Armenia
 St. Stepanos Church of Garaturan Village, Kesab District, Syria
 Several historical houses in Kesab Township, Kesab District, Syria

Publications 
 1983 to 1989 - 7 volumes of microfilms on Armenian Architecture
 Ակնարկ Հայկական ճարտարապետութեան (A Review of Armenian Architecture), 1988 
 Documents of Armenian Architecture: Nor Djulfa. Venezia, 1992.
 The Monasteries of St. Thaddeus the Apostle and St. Stephen the Proto-Deacon
 Julfa: The Annihilation of the Armenian Cemetery by Nakhijevan’s Azerbaijani Authorities
 Three Monasteries of Artaz

Awards 

 10 June 2008 - Order of Honour of the National Assembly of Armenia
 29 January 2009 - Hakob Meghapart Medal of the National Library of Armenia
 2009 - Diploma of Honour of the Ministry of Urban Development of Armenia

External links 

 Armen Hakhnazarian's biography
 An Interview with A. Hakhnazarian (11 March 1980, in Armenian)
 An Interview with A. Hakhnazarian (12 March 1980, in Armenian)
 An Interview with A. Hakhnazarian (7 August 2002, in Armenian)
 Order of Honour of the National Assembly of Armenia (in Armenian)
 “Vardzk” (“Sacred Duty”) Journal No. 1 Dedicated to Armen Hakhnazarian
 Biography of A. Hakhnazarian (in Armenian)
 An Obituary in the Historico-Philological Journal (in Armenian)
 An Obituary
 An Obituary (in German)

German people of Armenian descent
Iranian architects
Armenian studies scholars
Armenian art historians
Ethnic Armenian architects
1941 births
2009 deaths
People from Tehran
Iranian people of Armenian descent
Iranian emigrants to Germany
20th-century Iranian architects
20th-century Armenian historians
21st-century Armenian historians